Adilotar (Edal-Otar) is a rural locality (a selo) and the administrative centre of Adilotarsky Selsoviet, Khasavyurtovsky District, Republic of Dagestan, Russia. The population was 1,284 as of 2010. There are 32 streets.

Geography 
Adilotar is located 29 km north of Khasavyurt (the district's administrative centre) by road. Tutlar is the nearest rural locality.

References 

Rural localities in Khasavyurtovsky District